Tanrake is a village in Tuvalu. It is on Nui atoll, on Fenua Tapu islet. The location is 7.25°S 177.15°E.

Tanrake is also known as Manutalake – Meang. In the 2012 Census the population was 221 people.

See also

References

External links
  - Tanrake at World Gazetteer

Nui (atoll)
Populated places in Tuvalu